The Seven Society (founded 1905) is the most secretive of the University of Virginia's secret societies.  Members are only revealed after their death, when a wreath of black magnolias in the shape of a "7" is placed at the gravesite, the bell tower of the University Chapel chimes at seven-second intervals on the seventh dissonant chord when it is seven past the hour, and a notice is published in the university's Alumni News, and often in the Cavalier Daily. The most visible tradition of the society is the painting of the logo of the society, the number 7 surrounded by the signs for alpha (A), omega (Ω), and infinity (∞), and sometimes several stars, upon many buildings around the grounds of the university.

There is no clear history of the founding of the society. There is a legend that, of eight men who planned to meet for a card game, only seven showed up, and they formed the society. Other histories claim that the misbehavior of other secret societies, specifically the Hot Feet (later the IMP Society), led University President Edwin A. Alderman to call both the Hot Feet and the Z Society into his office and suggest that a more "beneficial organization" was needed.

The only known method to successfully contact the Seven Society is to place a letter at the Thomas Jefferson statue inside the university's historic Rotunda (accounts differ on the exact placement of the letter, either on the base or in the crook of the statue's arm).

Philanthropic gifts

The group contributes financially to the university, announcing donations with letters signed only with seven astronomical symbols in the order: Earth, Jupiter, Mercury, Mars, Neptune, Uranus, and Venus. The Society gives large monetary donations and scholarships to the university each year in quantities that include the number 7, e.g. $777 or $1,777.  Significant past gifts to the university include the Seven Society Carillon in the UVA Chapel, donated in memory of deceased members of the society, and given with the request that there should be a toll of seven times seven bells on the passing of a member; a memorial to past Seven Society members who gave their lives in World War I; $17,777.77 for a loan fund in honor of university president John Lloyd Newcomb; the ceremonial mace carried in academic processions; $10,777.77 in support of the re-establishment of Homecomings; a plaque on the Rotunda honoring University students who died in the Korean War; $7,077.77 to endow the Ernest Mead Fund for the Music Library; $47,777.77 for the making of a film on the honor system; and $1 million in support of the university's South Lawn Project. Most recently, the society gave a $777,777.77 grant to fund the Mead Endowment, founded in honor of Ernest Mead, which awards grants to professors to teach their "dream classes."

In addition to granting spontaneous gifts, the Seven Society sponsors an annual $7,000 graduate fellowship award for superb teaching.

Notable members
The Seven Society is unusual among University of Virginia secret societies in including members who were not students or alumni of the university. Notable examples include Mary Proffitt, secretary to Dean James M. Page and Dean Ivey F. Lewis; and Ivey F. Lewis himself, a non-alumnus professor and longtime dean of students at the university.

Several notable individuals whose Seven Society membership was disclosed at their death include:
 H. Lockwood Frizzell, drafted by the Philadelphia Eagles
Adm. William F. Halsey
Frank Hereford, fifth president of the University of Virginia and namesake of Hereford College
James Rogers McConnell, student and volunteer for the Lafayette Escadrille during World War I, memorialized in Gutzon Borglum's statue The Aviator
John Lloyd Newcomb, second president of the University of Virginia
Edward Stettinius, Jr., secretary of state under Presidents Roosevelt and Truman, and first US ambassador to the United Nations
Frank Wisner, head of the Central Intelligence Agency's Directorate of Plans during the 1950s
Joseph W. Twinam, American ambassador to Bahrain, 1974-1976
 Joe Edwin McCary, M.D. Quarterback and Captain 1948 UVA Football. Honorable Mention All-American. Senior Class Treasurer. Graduate of UVA Medical School, June 14, 1954.
 Ernest Mead, professor of music and chair of the McIntire Department of Music at UVA
 Glynn Key, Board of Visitors member.

Seven Society at other colleges/universities 
There have been several secret societies with "seven" in their name. No connection between the societies has been shown, but there is at least some tradition in the use of the names.

One such secret society is the Seven Society, Order of the Crown and Dagger, known to exist at the College of William and Mary in Williamsburg, Virginia.  The founding date of the William and Mary society is reported to have been as early as 1826.

A second unassociated secret society operates at Longwood University. The society known as Princeps, was founded on 7 principles of leadership. Members are selected during their undergraduate career and are not revealed until graduation by wearing a crimson sash bearing the 7. The group recognizes and honors citizens of the Longwood community who are exceptional leaders. The mysteries of this organization are only revealed with their dropped items around campus and their recognition of those who embody the spirit of Princeps. Students often step on the black 7 pointed crowns painted around campus for good luck.

A third society was the Mystic Seven Fraternity, constituted in 1885, of which the Virginia Temple of the Hands and Torch was the parent chapter. Prior to the Civil War, there had been a Mystical Seven Society, with several chapters across the South. One surviving group at Mississippi created a chapter at Virginia. That Virginia chapter later organized the Mystic Seven Fraternity, also calling the new organization Phi Theta Alpha. Five years later the Mystic Seven Fraternity merged with Beta Theta Pi, with the Virginia chapter becoming the Omicron chapter of Beta Theta Pi.

A fourth unrelated society, also called Mystical Seven, was founded in 1907 at the University of Missouri. It is often claimed that this society was directly inspired by the Seven Society at Virginia, (although no citations are given), but it took the older Mystical Seven name.

A fifth unrelated society is the Seven Society (The Club) at East Carolina University in Greenville, NC.  Established in 1927, the name of the organization was originally the "East Carolina Men's Social Club" until it was changed to "Seven Society" in 1962 for reasons unknown.  Referred to as simply "The Club" by most of its members, the sign of this society is the same as that of the Seven Society at the University of Virginia, except that the numbers "322" appear beneath the "7."  The numbers 322 are also depicted in the Skull and Bones secret society logo.  Notable members include: the screenwriter Kevin Williamson, James Maynard, and Vince McMahon.

See also
 Secret societies at the University of Virginia
 Collegiate secret societies in North America
 Skull and Bones (Yale University)
 Stewards Society (Georgetown University)

References

Collegiate secret societies
Student societies in the United States
University of Virginia
1905 establishments in Virginia
Secret societies in the United States
Student organizations established in 1905